Paul Hannam (7 October 1971 – 16 July 2022) was a Canadian physician and sailor. He competed in the men's 470 event at the 1996 Summer Olympics. He died aged 50 while running.

Education 
Hannam was a 1999 graduate in medicine from the University of British Columbia.

Career 
At the time of his death, Hannam was the chief of emergency medicine and program director at North York General Hospital in Toronto. He was also an assistant professor at the University of Toronto’s Department of Family and Community Medicine. Previously, he served as chief of emergency medicine at Michael Garron Hospital in East York for over a decade.  

Hannam died after collapsing while on a run on 16 July 2022, aged 50.

Family life 
Hannam was married to Rosemary Hannam.

References

External links 

 

1971 births
2022 deaths
Canadian male sailors (sport)
Olympic sailors of Canada
Sailors at the 1996 Summer Olympics – 470
Sportspeople from Vancouver
21st-century Canadian physicians
University of British Columbia Faculty of Medicine alumni